Touhean is a 1992 Bollywood film directed by Madan Joshi and produced by Manu Ahuja. It stars Raj Babbar, Dimple Kapadia, Padmini Kolhapure in lead roles, along with Shashi Kapoor, Aruna Irani, Shreeram Lagoo, Shakti Kapoor in supporting roles. The music was composed by Bappi Lahiri. The film was completed in 1987 and ready for release, but due to the distribution problem, the film was finally released in 1992.

Cast
Shashi Kapoor as Dr. Rizvi
Raj Babbar as Dr. Sharad
Dimple Kapadia as Deepika 
Padmini Kolhapure as Sansani / Sandhya
Aruna Irani as Margaret
Shakti Kapoor as Bihari
Satish Shah as Dr. Mittal
Shreeram Lagoo as Mr. Shrivastav
Urmila Bhatt as Gomti Bai
Jagdeep as Naseebdar
Mohan Choti as Banana Seller
Manmohan Krishna as Singer

Music

External links
 

Films scored by Bappi Lahiri
1992 films
1990s Hindi-language films